Kahn-e Qazi (also Romanized as Kahn-e Qāẕī and Kahn-e Qāzī; also known as Kahn-e Qāzt, Kohneh Qāẕat, and Qanāt-e Qāẕī) is a village in Horjand Rural District, Kuhsaran District, Ravar County, Kerman Province, Iran. At the 2006 census, its population was 163, in 41 families.

References 

Populated places in Ravar County